Enrique Estrázulas (Montevideo, 9 January 1942 - 8 March 2016) was a Uruguayan writer, poet, essayist, playwright, journalist, and diplomat.

His most famous work was the novel Pepe Corvina (1974). He was also Ambassador to Cuba.

Work 

Poetry
 El Sótano (1965)
 Fueye (1968)
 Caja de tiempo (1971)
 Confesión de los perros (1975)
 Poemas de amor -Madrigales, Blasfemias (1979)
 Claroscuros (anthology) (2013)

Novels
 Pepe Corvina (1974)
 Lucifer ha llorado (1980)
 El ladrón de música (1982)
 El amante de paja (1986)
 Tango para intelectuales (1990)
 Los manuscritos del Caimán (Sudamericana, Buenos Aires, 2004)
 Espérame Manon (Planeta, Montevideo, 2009)
 El sueño del ladrón (Sudamericana, 2013)

Stories
 Los viejísimos cielos (1975)
 Las claraboyas (1975)
 Cuentos fantásticos (1984)
 Antología personal (1984)
 La cerrazón humana (Seix Barral, Montevideo, 2007)

Essays
 La canción de la mugre (1970) 
 Mientras viva un poeta, un ladrón y una puta - an essay about Carlos de la Púa (1970) 
 El canto de la flor en la boca (1978)
 Alfredo Zitarrosa, cantar en uruguayo

Plays
 Borges y Perón (1998)
 La puta y el sacristán (2008)
 Gardel en Santamaría (2010)

References

External links 
 Estrázulas en Radio Espectador
 Conversando en Letras-Uruguay
 Canciones escritas por E.Estrázulas
 Enrique Estrázulas escribe sobre Alfredo Zitarrosa

1942 births
2016 deaths
Uruguayan male poets
Uruguayan essayists
Uruguayan dramatists and playwrights
Uruguayan journalists
Uruguayan diplomats
Ambassadors of Uruguay to Cuba
20th-century Uruguayan poets
20th-century Uruguayan male writers
Burials at the Central Cemetery of Montevideo